Sincerely Dears... is Yukari Tamura's second compilation album, released on March 28, 2007. It contains a bonus DVD with a digest version of her 2006 concert tour *fancy baby doll* filmed in Tokyo and Fukuoka and a Special Photo Book.

Track listing 

 summer melody
 Lyrics: Karin
 Arrangement and composition: Acryl Vox
 Love♡parade
 Lyrics: Karen Shiina
 Composition: Mioko Yamaguchi
 Arrangement: Masami Kishimura
 Baby's Breath
 Lyrics: Yukiko Mitsui
 Composition: cota
 Arrangement: Masaki Iwamoto
 Lovely Magic
 Lyrics and composition: Mika Watanabe
 Arrangement: Mika Watanabe and Kanichirou Kubo
 Opening theme song of her radio show, .
 
 Lyrics: Manami Fujino
 Arrangement and composition: Tsugumi Kataoka
 
 Lyrics: Uran
 Arrangement and composition: Kaoru Okubo
 Opening theme song of her radio show, .
 Little Wish ～lyrical step～
 Lyrics: Karen Shiina
 Arrangement and composition: Masatomo Ota
 Ending theme song for 
 
 Lyrics: Miku Hazuki
 Composition and arrangement: Kazuya Komatsu
 Opening theme for  TV series
 Spiritual Garden
 Lyrics: Yukiko Mitsui
 Composition and arrangement: Masatomo Ota
 Ending theme song for 
 
 Lyrics: Aki Hata
 Arrangement and composition: Masatomo Ota
 Opening theme song for  TV series
 Princess Rose
 Lyrics: Yukiko Mitsui
 Arrangement and composition: Yukari Hashimoto
 Second opening theme song for  TV series
 YOURS EVER
 Lyrics and composition: marhy
 Arrangement: marhy, tetsu-yeah

DVD 
Concert Tour 2006 *fancy baby doll*　Special Edition
 opening
 Little Wish ～first step～
 Cutie♡Cutie
 
 
 
 -backstage of FBD tour-
 Amazing kiss
 Black cherry
 
 
 fancy baby doll
 -neko, neco & yukari-
 - MC -
 
 ending

References

External links 
 

Yukari Tamura albums
2007 compilation albums
2007 live albums
2007 video albums
Live video albums